Anna-Lena Grönefeld (also spelled Groenefeld; born 4 June 1985) is a German retired professional tennis player.

Competing as a professional from 2003 until 2019, she won one singles title on the WTA Tour, at the 2006 Mexican Open, and reached the quarterfinals of the 2006 French Open. She is a two-time Grand Slam champion in mixed doubles, having won the 2009 Wimbledon Championships alongside Mark Knowles, and the 2014 French Open with Jean-Julien Rojer. Grönefeld also finished runner-up in mixed doubles at the 2016 Wimbledon Championships and 2017 French Open.

In women's doubles, Grönefeld won 17 WTA Titles, most notably the 2005 Rogers Cup with Martina Navratilova, and reached seven Grand Slam semifinals. She was part of the German team which reached the final of the 2014 Davis Cup, and competed at the 2012 and 2016 Olympic Games.

Career

2002–2006: Breakthrough
In 2002, she was the singles champion of both the Belgium and Frankfurt International Championships and a finalist at the Orange Bowl. In June 2003, she captured the prestigious French Open junior title, becoming the first player from Germany since 1957 to accomplish this feat. In July 2003, she continued her superb form and won the Apple and Eve Newsday Long Island Classic, held in Woodbury, New York. She was also an accomplished doubles player in juniors winning the French Open title and reaching the finals at Wimbledon. As a result of her tennis success in 2003, Grönefeld had achieved the junior world ranking of No. 1 in singles and doubles. She launched her professional career debut under the direction of the USA Academy and Rafael Font de Mora.

Grönefeld made her professional breakthrough in 2005, rising 54 places throughout the year. She reached the third round of the Australian Open, French Open and the US Open and played three finals in WTA Tour events throughout the season, including at the Tier II event in Beijing, although failing to win any of them. She also rose into the top 10 in the world in doubles, cementing her position as one of the most promising young doubles players on the tour at the time.

In 2006, she represented Germany along with Nicolas Kiefer at the Hopman Cup. She went on to win her first title at the Abierto Mexicano Telcel in Acapulco and completed a career best showing at Roland Garros, by reaching the quarterfinals, where she lost to Justine Henin. Her ranking peaked at 14, and remained in the top 20 for much of the year, despite a significant drop in results in the latter half of the season, as the German failed to progress beyond the quarterfinals of most tournaments. She split with Font de Mora in September 2006 and began to work with Dirk Dier.

2007: Loss of form
Her run of bad form continued into 2007, and as of 19 June, Grönefeld had been eliminated in the first round of her last five tournaments. Grönefeld blamed her run of bad form on the situation with Font de Mora, suggesting that he was giving her opponents tactics on how to beat her. She also had a substantial weight gain over the past several months. Her ranking subsequently dipped below the top 100 for the first time since 2004. On 20 August 2007, Grönefeld announced that she would be taking a break from the tour, coming back in 2008.

In August 2007, it was revealed that Font de Mora was planning to sue Grönefeld for lack of discipline during their partnership, stating: "She had to adhere to a standard of performance, a standard of training and a standard of diet. She absolutely let herself go and sabotaged her marketability and her performance on the court. You work for years and invest all this money into developing contracts and developing endorsements and then she just gets around the wrong people and does the wrong things and her performance affects everything." He also denied her allegations that he interfered with her matches.

2008–2009: Comeback
Grönefeld made her official comeback on 3 May 2008, at the $75,000 ITF event in Zagreb, Croatia. She was seeded 4th in the qualifying draw, winning three consecutive matches to reach the main draw. She then won the Smart Card Open Monet+ in Zlín, Czech Republic, for the first title of her comeback. Grönefeld went on to win another two ITF title over the following fortnight: a $10,000 event in Alkmaar, Netherlands, and a $25,000 event at Périgueux, France.

Grönefeld took advantage of her feed-up wildcard into the Tier IV Gaz de France Grand Prix (a result of winning the $75,000 Zlín ITF event), reaching the quarterfinals with an upset win over Lucie Šafářová. She then played in Bad Gastein, where she was defeated in three tight sets in the second round by Pauline Parmentier.

Her good form allowed Grönefeld to win another $50,000 ITF event in Rimini at the beginning of August. She also reached the final of a $50,000 event in The Bronx, where she lost to Elena Bovina.

After winning her three qualification rounds, Grönefeld played at the 2008 US Open, and reached the fourth round of the main draw, only losing to Dinara Safina. Prior to her loss to Safina, Grönefeld had won six matches in a row without losing a single set, the highlights being her victory over Daniela Hantuchová in the first round and over Alizé Cornet in the third round, both top 20 players at the time.

After losing against Austrian runner-up Tamira Paszek in the first round in Bali, Grönefeld received a wildcard for the Porsche Tennis Grand Prix in Stuttgart but lost in the first round against Venus Williams. With her doubles partner, Patty Schnyder, Grönefeld, however, won the doubles competition against the top seeds Květa Peschke and Rennae Stubbs.

After winning the first two matches at the qualification for the Zurich Open, Grönefeld lost her third match against Petra Kvitová. With doubles partner Patty Schnyder she reached the finals.

Performance timelines

Only main-draw results in WTA Tour, Grand Slam tournaments, Fed Cup and Olympic Games are included in win–loss records.

Singles

Doubles

Mixed doubles

Significant finals

Grand Slam finals

Mixed doubles: 4 (2 titles, 2 runner-ups)

Premier Mandatory / Premier 5 finals

Doubles: 10 (1 title, 9 runner-ups)

WTA career finals

Singles: 4 (1 title, 3 runner-ups)

Doubles: 44 (17 titles, 27 runner-ups)

WTA 125 tournament finals

Doubles: 1 (1 title)

ITF finals

Singles (12–2)

Doubles (6–1)

Fed Cup statistics

References

External links

 
 
 
 
 
 

1985 births
Living people
People from Nordhorn
German female tennis players
Wimbledon champions
French Open champions
French Open junior champions
Hopman Cup competitors
Tennis players at the 2012 Summer Olympics
Tennis players at the 2016 Summer Olympics
Olympic tennis players of Germany
Grand Slam (tennis) champions in mixed doubles
Grand Slam (tennis) champions in girls' singles
Grand Slam (tennis) champions in girls' doubles
Tennis people from Lower Saxony